Charles Mingus Sextet In Berlin is an unauthorized live album by American jazz bassist Charles Mingus recorded on 5 November 1970, Berlin, West Germany, together with his sextet. The status of this recording is unknown.

Track listing

Personnel
Charles Mingus – bass 
Charles McPherson – alto saxophone 
Dannie Richmond – drums 
Jaki Byard – piano 
Bobby Jones – tenor saxophone, clarinet
Eddie Preston – trumpet

References

Charles Mingus albums
1970 albums